Carrie Bradley is an American violinist and vocalist. She was a founding member of the alternative folk band Ed's Redeeming Qualities, and has played in The Breeders and 100 Watt Smile. Since 2003, Bradley has appeared as half of the San Francisco-based musical duo The Great Auk.

References

External links
The Great Auk MySpace Page

Living people
American women singers
American rock violinists
Women violinists
The Breeders members
Year of birth missing (living people)
21st-century violinists